Code Name Phoenix is a television film that aired on UPN on March 3, 2000. It was directed by Jeff Freilich. The film score was composed by Mark Snow.

Plot
In the year 2020, where global peace has prevailed, a sinister new threat to world stability is exposed with a genetically engineered virus that can stop the human aging process. Faced with potential worldwide anarchy when the masses clamor for the drug, Special Agent Lucy Chang, code name Phoenix, must go undercover to track the drug's illegal marketer who has conspired with a beauty products magnate to auction the virus' rights to international bidders and ensure worldwide chaos. Chang is publicly denounced as a fugitive by a traitor in her organization and is immediately sought by Jake Hawkins, a U.S. Marshal. Convincing Jake that a planet-wide destabilization threat exists if the virus is made public, the duo joins forces and, with the combination of her remarkable martial arts prowess and his high-tech weaponry, battle to expose the plot and destroy the virus supply.

Cast
 Jeanne Chinn as Agent Lucy Chang
 Jeffrey Meek as US Marshal Jake Hawkins
 Lexa Doig as Conchita Flores
 Denis Akiyama as Dr. Fong
 David Arnot as Sasha
 Alec McClure as Digital image of Sasha
 Jonathan Scarfe as Kenny Baker

References

External links

Yahoo TV

2000 television films
2000 films
2000 science fiction films
2000s American films
2000s English-language films
American science fiction television films
Films about genetic engineering
Films scored by Mark Snow
Films set in 2020
Films set in the future
UPN original films